The Trial of Andres Bonifacio is a 2010 film directed by Mario O'Hara. It was entered in the Director's Showcase category of that year's Cinemalaya film festival, and was the director's last film.

Cast
Alfred Vargas as Andrés Bonifacio
Lance Raymundo as Emilio Aguinaldo
Danielle Castaño as Gregoria de Jesus
Ian Palma as Pío del Pilar

Awards and nominations

References

External links

2010 films
Cultural depictions of Andrés Bonifacio
Cultural depictions of Emilio Aguinaldo
Philippine biographical films
Films directed by Mario O'Hara